Southey is a town in the Canadian province of Saskatchewan. It is on Highway 6, approximately 55 km north of Regina, the capital city of the province of Saskatchewan.

Southey is named after a famous English poet, Robert Southey. Additionally, most of the streets of Southey are named after English and Scottish poets.

Demographics 

According to the 2011 census, Southey's median age was 39.9 years (males:37.4 yrs., females:42.0 yrs.) It had the median household income was $71,585.

History

The vast prairie land of the North-West Territories was opened for settlement during the latter part of the 1880s and 1890s. Prior to this, the whole area was home to the First Nations people and their culture. Settlement by Europeans and Americans followed the river valleys and then the westward movement of the railway.

The first early settlement in the Southey area consisted of ranchers north and south of the present townsite.  H.B. Chandler, one of the first settlers, filed on land on the south side of town in 1903. When the railway arrived in the area, he applied for the site to be named “Southey”, after Robert Southey, one of his favourite English poets.

From this point on, the town grew and developed with the appearance of the first stores, school, banks, elevators, barber shop, hardware and implement dealers, restaurants, lumber yard, telephone system, sidewalks, fire brigades, and others in the 1905 - 1912 period. This growth allowed Southey to be incorporated in 1907–08.  Subsequently, streets were named after other British writers and poets, so it is possible to travel down streets named Keats, Browning, Burns, Byron, Coleridge, Frost, Kipling, Milton, and others.

In 1988 Southey celebrated its 80th anniversary and in 2008 the town had a 100th year celebration.

Sports and recreation
Southey has a curling rink, swimming pool, nearby golf courses, and an ice rink at the Southey Communiplex. The Southey Marlins of the senior men's Highway Hockey League play there, except right now the team is on a hiatus.

Education

The Robert Southey School is a K-12 school incorporating over 100 years of history. In 2006 Southey School celebrated its centenary.

Churches

The people of Southey and District have four main centres for religious congregations:
Southey Baptist Church
Southey Emmanuel Lutheran Church
Southey St James Roman Catholic Church
Southey United Church

Southey Cable

The Southey Cable Company is owned and operated by the Town of Southey under the guidance of the Southey Cable Committee.

Notable people
 Donna Kriekle, artist

Gallery

See also 
 List of communities in Saskatchewan
 List of towns in Saskatchewan

References

External links

Towns in Saskatchewan
Cupar No. 218, Saskatchewan
Division No. 6, Saskatchewan